Helong (Chosŏn'gŭl: 화룡; Hangul: 허룽) is a county-level city in southeastern Jilin province, Northeast China. It is under the administration of the Yanbian Korean Autonomous Prefecture.

Administrative divisions

Helong has three subdistricts and eight towns.

Subdistricts:
Wenhua Subdistrict (文化街道 / 문화가도), Minhui Subdistrict (民惠街道 / 민혜가도), Guangming Subdistrict (光明街道 / 광명가도)

Towns:
Toudao (头道镇 / 두도진), Bajiazi (八家子镇 / 팔가자진), Fudong (福洞镇 / 복동진), Xicheng (西城镇 / 서성진), Nanping (南坪镇 / 남평진), Longcheng (龙城镇 / 용성진), Dongcheng (东城镇 / 동성진), Chongshan (崇善镇 / 숭선진)

Climate

References

External links
Official website of Helong government

Cities in Yanbian
County-level divisions of Jilin